The Heresy of Love is a 2012 play by the British playwright Helen Edmundson, based on the life of Juana Inés de la Cruz. It was premiered by the Royal Shakespeare Company in early 2012, with a cast including Ray Coulthard and directed by Nancy Meckler. It was later produced at Shakespeare's Globe from July to September 2015. directed by John Dove.

Casts

References

Helen Edmundson
2012 plays
British plays
Plays set in the 17th century
Plays set in Mexico
Biographical plays about writers